The seventh season of the food reality television series Man v. Food premiered on May 28, 2018 at 9PM ET on the Travel Channel. This is the third season of the show to be hosted by actor and food enthusiast Casey Webb, who took over as host in 2017 following a 5-year hiatus for the show. As ever, Webb spends each episode visiting local eateries in a different city to sample their "big food" offerings before taking on an existing local food challenge in that city.

This season ended with an even record of 7 wins for "Man" and 7 wins for "Food".

Episodes

References

External links
 Man v. Food official website

2018 American television seasons
Man v. Food